Maurice William "Maury" Uhler (December 14, 1886 – May 4, 1918) was a Major League Baseball outfielder who played in  with the Cincinnati Reds. He batted and threw right-handed. Uhler had a .214 batting average in 46 games in his one-year career.

He was born in Pikesville, Maryland, and died in Baltimore, Maryland.

External links

1886 births
1918 deaths
Major League Baseball outfielders
Baseball players from Maryland
Cincinnati Reds players
People from Pikesville, Maryland